The Five O'Clock Follies is a sobriquet for military press briefings that occurred during the Vietnam War. Richard Pyle, Associated Press Saigon bureau chief during the war, described the briefings as, "the longest-playing tragicomedy in Southeast Asia's theater of the absurd."

The briefings occurred in Saigon's Rex Hotel, and journalists alternately cracked cynical jokes and shouted at officials, often complaining about a credibility gap between official reports and the truth. Public affairs officer Barry Zorthian led the briefings. He once lamented that where the US government's word was once true until proven false, in Vietnam, it would be questioned until proven true.

Journalists updated the name during the Gulf War. Press briefings at that time were unofficially known as the "Four O'Clock Follies."

References

American political neologisms
Lyndon B. Johnson
Nicknames
Political history of the United States
Richard Nixon
Vietnam War and the media
1960s neologisms